Jérémy Le Douaron (born 21 April 1998) is a French professional footballer who plays as a forward for  club Brest.

Career
Le Douaron made his professional debut with Brest in a 4–0 Ligue 1 loss to Nîmes on 23 August 2020.

References

External links
 
 Jérémy Le Douaron at playmakerstats.com (English version of leballonrond.fr)

1998 births
Living people
Sportspeople from Côtes-d'Armor
French footballers
Footballers from Brittany
Association football forwards
Ligue 1 players
Ligue 2 players
Championnat National 2 players
Stade Briochin players
Stade Brestois 29 players